The Free Application for Federal Student Aid (FAFSA) is a form completed by current and prospective college students (undergraduate and graduate) in the United States to determine their eligibility for student financial aid.

The FAFSA is different than CSS Profile (short for "College Scholarship Service Profile"), which is also required by some colleges (primarily private ones). The CSS is a fee-based product of the College Board (a private non-profit organization) and is used by the colleges to distribute their own institutional funds, rather than federal or state funding.

Eligibility

In order to receive federal student financial aid, students must meet the following criteria:
	
 have maintained a Satisfactory Academic Progress (SAP);	
 be a U.S. citizen, a U.S. national, or an eligible non-citizen;	
 have a valid Social Security number;	
 have a high school diploma or GED;	
 have signed the certification statement stating that: 1) they are not in default on a federal student loan and do not owe money on a federal student grant and 2) federal student aid will only be used for educational purposes;
 have not been found guilty of the sale or possession of illegal drugs while federal aid was being received.

Male students between the ages of 18 and 25 were generally required be registered with the Selective Service System (for Conscription in the United States), but the FAFSA Simplification Act removed this requirement starting with the 2021-2022 school year. The FAFSA Simplification Act was a part of the Consolidated Appropriations Act, 2021.

Students who are military veterans and active duty service members may apply for financial aid by filing a FAFSA even if they also apply for education and housing benefits offered by the Post-9/11 G.I. Bill and its accompanying Yellow Ribbon program. The amount of military aid a student receives for a college education does not defer eligibility or reduce the amount of student aid that student could receive from the four federal grant programs – Pell, SMART, FSEOG, and TEACH – and many of the state student aid programs.

Student Aid and Fiscal Responsibility Act (SAFRA) of 2010 changed the criteria for suspension of eligibility for drug-related offenses. Previously, students could lose eligibility for either the possession or sale of a controlled substance during the period of enrollment. SAFRA dropped the penalties for possession of a controlled substance but retained the penalties for sale of a controlled substance. SAFRA increases the suspension to two years for a first offense and indefinite for a second offense.

Most students who are eligible to receive federal aid and complete the FAFSA will receive some form of financial aid regardless of their financial need.

Preparation and filing options
As of the 2017–2018 academic year, the FAFSA is made available to the public on October 1 every year for the future academic year. The 2016–2017 academic year was the final time the FAFSA was not made available until January 1. The US Department of Education made the FAFSA available earlier to more closely align the timing of the financial aid application process with the typical college application process. Additionally, 2-year old US tax information is used to complete the financial sections of the FAFSA beginning with the 2017–2018 academic year. This change in using "prior-prior tax year" information enables families to use the IRS Data Retrieval Tool in the FAFSA to verify their tax information without a delay from the IRS processing tax information. Some financial aid is provided on a first-come, first-served basis, and students are encouraged to submit a FAFSA as soon as possible.

According to the U.S. Department of Education's website, students have three options for filling out the form:

 in the myStudentAid mobile app
Call 1-800-433-3243 to obtain a PDF of the form

The Higher Education Opportunity Act of 2008 authorized fee-based FAFSA preparation. By law, fee-based FAFSA preparation services must on initial contact with students inform them of the free option and be transparent about their non-affiliation with the U.S. Department of Education and their fees.

Application process
Applicants complete the FAFSA by providing their demographic and financial information and, in many cases, the demographic and financial information of their parents/guardians. In addition to this demographic and financial information, applicants can list up to ten schools to receive the results of the application once it is processed. Historically, there was some concern that colleges could deny admission, waitlist applicants, or offer less financial aid as a result of the order in which applicants list schools on the application, or FAFSA position. However, the US Department of Education changed the FAFSA for the 2016–2017 academic year to prevent schools from having access to view other schools that may be listed on the application.

After completing the FAFSA, students are presented with a Student Aid Report (SAR). The SAR provides a student with their potential eligibility for different types of financial aid, their Expected Family Contribution (EFC), and a summary of the data a student provided in the application. An electronic version of the SAR (called an ISIR) is made available to the colleges/universities the student includes on the FAFSA. The ISIR is also sent to state agencies that award need-based aid.

Students can file an appeal with their college financial aid office in order to seek additional financial aid if their current financial situation is no longer the same as the financial information they provided on FAFSA (i.e. their parent recently lost their job). The exact appeal process can vary from school to school. SwiftStudent, a free service, provides template letters for college students to use when appealing their financial aid.

Currently, students can only list ten schools on their FAFSA application. If students are applying to more than 10 colleges or universities, there are three options they can choose from that allow them to submit their FAFSA application to additional schools.

Types of federal financial aid
Federal Student Aid offers several different types of financial aid programs.

 Pell Grant – A grant of up to $6,195 (as of the 2019–2020 Award Year) for students with a low expected family contribution. A 2018 NerdWallet study found that students missed out on $2.6 billion in free federal Pell grants by not completing the FAFSA.
 Federal Supplemental Educational Opportunity Grant (FSEOG) – A grant between $100 – $4,000 for eligible students and the award is available for Undergraduate students. This grant money is limited at colleges and universities and usually is given to those who have completed their FAFSA application early and are eligible to receive this grant. 
 Federal Direct Subsidized Loan – Part of the Federal Direct Student Loan Program, Federal Direct Subsidized loans are need-based loans whose interest is paid by the government while the student is enrolled at least half time. Direct Subsidized Loans have fixed interest rates for the life-time of the loan. The interest rates for new loans are set yearly by the U.S. Congress.
 Federal Direct Unsubsidized Loan - Part of the Federal Direct Student Loan Program, Federal Direct Unsubsidized Loans are not need-based, meaning that nearly all students are eligible to receive them. Unlike Federal Direct Subsidized Loans, Direct Unsubsidized Loans accrue interest the moment they are applied to a student's tuition account. Similar to Direct Subsidized Loans, Direct Unsubsidized Loans have fixed interest rates that are set yearly by the U.S. Congress. 
The Federal Work-Study Program – An employment program that encourages students with low expected family contributions to find part-time work while pursuing their studies. The program allows the federal government to subsidize a student's employer by paying around half of the student's wages up to a certain amount. Students do not need to have Federal Work Study to work but some university or non-profit positions may require a student to have Federal Work Study in order to be employed.

Types of Illinois Grant Programs (Also obtained by filling out the FAFSA)

These Illinois programs are offered by ISAC (Illinois Student Assistance Commission) but can also be obtained along with the federal aid programs when filling out the FAFSA.

 The MAP grant which is the Monetary Award Program (second biggest grant after Pell) is awarded to Illinois undergraduate students & can be used at only the approved Illinois public and private 2 and 4 year colleges along with other degree granting institutions. Funding is limited
 Illinois Veteran Grant (IVG) is an entitlement program where Illinois veterans with at least 1 year of active duty service can earn funds to a maximum of 4 academic years for tuition and mandatory fees.
 Illinois National Guard (ING) grant (very similar to the IVG) is an entitlement program that offer aid to pay tuition and certain fees for those in the National Guard with one full year of active service or those who have been discharged recently.

Certain Requirements may apply to these programs so further research may need to be done.

History 

FAFSA originally came from the 1965 Higher Education Act (HEA) by President Lyndon Johnson, this established the United States Government as the primary provider of financial aid for students. For years the application was called Financial Aid Form (FAF), which was an optional form used by some—but not all—colleges and universities. When Congress reauthorized the HEA in 1992 they created a standardized federal form for all prospective students seeking aid. The stated goal of FAFSA and other government funded education programs was to create equal opportunities for students seeking higher education. When the HEA was reauthorized again in 2008 lawmakers added a clause that schools must report information about who is receiving financial aid.  Subsequent studies revealed continued inequality for students of color, who often had to take out more student loans than more privileged counterparts.  

Recent updates have been made to increase accessibility of financial aid. The original FAFSA form had 108 questions, which was a significant barrier for many low-income families seeking financial aid. The questions were broadly seen as excessively detailed and unnecessarily complicated, with students being required to dedicate several hours to completing their application. The Consolidated Appropriations Act, 2021 shortened the FAFSA from 108 questions to 36, to encourage more eligible students to fill out the form.  In addition, students now have the option to link their IRS account with their FAFSA account to make the application simpler to complete accurately. The Consolidated Appropriations Act also opened financial aid eligibility to students that had previously been excluded from the program.

See also
 College admissions in the United States
 CSS Profile
 Edifi
 FAFSA position (only relevant prior to the 2016–2017 academic year)
 Transfer admissions in the United States

References

External links

 The official government site for the FAFSA 
 FAFSA4caster – U.S. Department of EducationFAFSA aid estimating tool
 

Student financial aid in the United States
Education finance in the United States
University and college admissions in the United States
United States government forms